Conjugal Visit is a 2022 Iranian romance drama film directed by Omid Shams and written by Shams, Bahman Ark and Ali Sarahang. It stars Parinaz Izadyar and Hootan Shakiba as Parvaneh and Farhad, a couple who met secretly through Farhad's phone in prison which he sometimes borrow it to Parvaneh's father—who is in prison with Farhad—to call his daughter, and started to develop feelings for each other.

Conjugal Visit premiered in competition at the 40th Fajr Film Festival on February 1, 2022, and earned 2 nominations. It was later set to release theatrically on September 29, 2022, but later postpended to January 4, 2023, due to the ongoing protests in Iran.

Premise 
The story is about a girl named Parvaneh (Parinaz Izadyar) who owns a perfume shop in the suburbs of Tehran. Parvaneh's father is in prison for theft. Farhad (Hootan Shakiba), a young teacher who is Parvaneh's father's ally, is in touch with Parvaneh from time to time to do some of Iraj's work. One day, Farhad expresses interest in Parvaneh and invites her to visit him in prison.

Cast 

 Parinaz Izadyar as Parvaneh
 Hootan Shakiba as Farhad
 Rima Raminfar as Fariba
 Roya Teymourian as Parvaneh's mother
 Siavash Cheraghi Pour as Iraj, Parvaneh's father
 Nader Fallah
 Payam Ahmadinia
 Shirin Agharezakashi
 Hossein Parsaei
 Javad Ghamati
 Iman Shams as Iman, Parvaneh's brother
 Amir Hossein Bayat
 Alireza Zareparast
 Masoumeh Ahmadzadeh
 Farhad Shahbazi
 Hossein Shafiei

Release 
Conjugal Visit was screened for the first time on February 1, 2022, in competition at the 40th Fajr Film Festival, where it was nominated for two Crystal Simorgh for Best Supporting Actor for Payam Ahmadinia and nominated for the Best First Film award.

The film was banned until September 23, 2022, and was scheduled to be released on September 29, 2022, but later postpended to January 4, 2023, due to the ongoing Mahsa Amini protests. Director Omid Shams said in an interview with IRNA that at this time he had no desire to release the film widely. He added that the film was not censored and was "almost" the version shown at the Fajr Film Festival.

Reception

Box office 
Among 22 films, Conjugal Visit became the best-selling film of the 40th Fajr Film Festival, earning 818 million Tomans.

Conjugal Visit sold more than 4,000 tickets and 145 million Tomans one day after its release. This film was shown in 200 theaters in the first three days and earned 850 million Tomans. Conjugal Visit had the best opening in the last three months and reached the second place after Bucharest.

IRNA wrote that not having a competitor, a different genre from previous screenings, advertisements and the presence of Izadyar and Shakiba will make the film more popular. However, the film did not achieve high sales at the box office. Mahmoud Gabarlou in ISNA said that the reason for the poor performance of Conjugal Visit and Left, Right at the box office is the existence of a huge gap between the tastes of the audience and government officials.

Critical response 
The film was named by Film Emrooz the Best Film of the festival after The Night Guardian, it was also named the Best Film of the festival by Cinematicket and Salamcinema users during the festival.

Accolades

Controversy

Resignation from Fajr Film Festival awards 
The film screened for the first time at the Main Competition of the 40th Fajr Film Festival and a day before the closing ceremony and the award presentation, the Fajr Film Festival announced that they will not give the Crystal Simorgh for Audience Choice of Best Film this year, for the first time. By that time, the analysis of the sales of 22 films in the competition section of the 40th Fajr Film Festival showed that Conjugal Visit was the best-selling film of the festival with 818 million tomans, and in a shoulder-to-shoulder competition with 4 million tomans more than Mohammad Hossein Mahdavian's The Loser Man (2022).

Amir Banan, the producer of the film, in response to the removal of the Crystal Simorgh for Audience Choice of Best Film, said that this decision caused damage to the public dignity of the Fajr Film Festival and damage to the reputation of Iranian cinema, and further decided to withdraw from judging his film in this period. to declare his protest and his agents in a practical way so that his film is not judged in any of the sections.

Because of this incident, the film's staff did not attend the closing ceremony and later, Hootan Shakiba, Parinaz Izadyar and other staff of the film published a post on their Instagram with the below caption:

Conjugal Visit had the first place on the voting section on the last ten days of the festival. on February 10, 2022, when The nominees for the 40th Fajr Film Festival were announced at a press conference, everyone was shocked that the film had only two nominations for Best Supporting Actor and Best First Film and the films cast and crew were angry that their film was judged. This raised the voice of the producer and other actors of the film to protest again, which the secretary of the festival responded to the protest. The secretary stated that:

However, none of the cast and crew attended the closing ceremony.

Censorship and ban 
Omid Shams, the director of the film, said at the time of the screening:

In response to the question to what extent this film has been censored, he stated:

References

External links

Iranian drama films
2020s Persian-language films